Cliff Stephens Park is in Pinellas County, Florida. It is managed as part of the Southwest Florida Water Management District. The park provides for stormwater and flood management, and includes trails for bicycling, hiking and inline skating, as well as opportunities for boating, fishing, frisbee golf, a 19 station exercise course, and picnic area.

References

Parks in Pinellas County, Florida
Protected areas established in 1980
1980 establishments in Florida
Southwest Florida Water Management District reserves